The Audi Type K was a car introduced by Audi at the Berlin Motor Show in September 1921. Since the end of the war Audi had till now produced only cars of pre-war design, so that the Type K was the first post-war Audi design to be offered. The Type K entered production in 1922 and was withdrawn in 1925, by which time the company had commenced production, in 1924, their Type M model which can be seen as a larger replacement for the Type K. The Audi Type K was the first volume produced car in Germany to feature left-hand drive.

In retrospect the car has been seen as one of the most technically advanced cars of its time. It had a four-cylinder in-line engine with 3.6 litres of displacement, incorporating an aluminium cylinder block with replaceable cylinder liners (eingepressten Laufbuchsen). Claimed top speed was 95 km/h (59 mph).

The car had two leaf-sprung solid axles. It was available as a four-seat touring car, four-door sedan or as a two-door coupé-cabriolet. The production volume as "not more than approx 750".

Specification

Sources

Works cited
 Oswald, Werner: Deutsche Autos 1920–1945, Motorbuch Verlag Stuttgart, 10. Auflage (1996), 
 

1920s cars
Type K